Gold mining in Brazil has taken place continually in the Amazon, beginning in the 1690s, and has profoundly transformed the economy of Brazil and other surrounding countries. In the late 17th century, amid the search for indigenous people to use in the slave trade, Portuguese colonists began to recognize the abundance of gold in the Amazon, triggering what would become the longest gold rush in history. As a consequence, the area was flooded with prospectors from around the globe. Because of an already profitable agricultural operation taking place in the east, many Brazilians have been funneled into the jungle as part of several agricultural reform programs. Though the methods and practices have changed in the following centuries, the fact remains that the Amazon can yield tremendous quantities of gold for those who are willing to venture into the jungle. The work is often dangerous and detrimental to the surrounding ecosystems. Because artisanal mining is prohibited under federal law, the methods employed are often crude and unregulated, resulting in polluted water and massive deforestation. 

More recently, partly due to the increasing price of gold, small-scale mining activity increased by 300% from 2000 to 2010. Illegal miners have been emboldened by the policies of President Jair Bolsonaro who has opposed the protection of indigenous populations living in areas targeted for mining.

The beginning

In the 1690s, colonists known as Bandeirantes roamed the countryside (notably southeastern Colonial Brazil) looking for indigenous people to capture for the slave trade and, gold was discovered. The discovery changed the history of eastern South America, expanded the use of indigenous and African slaves in the Portuguese colonial regions of the continent, and contributed to the borders of present-day Brazil. The Bandeirantes found gold in the present-day state of Minas Gerais.

Unlike other gold rushes in the world's history, the Brazilian Gold Rush lasted the longest, from the 1690s into the 19th century. In contrast to the 1840s−1850s California Gold Rush, which helped the United States establish a new "Industrial Revolution" era infrastructure, the Brazilian gold rush saw mass migration but little new non-mining infrastructure in the colony. Much like other gold rushes around the world of the era, the natural resources received notable environmental degradation from the mining process. What sets the Brazilian gold rush apart is that the consequences of losing environmentally crucial resources did not hinder the mining of gold.

Between 1693 and 1720, some 400,000 Portuguese and 500,000 slaves relocated to southeastern Brazil to mine gold. Such was the growth that, by 1725, half of Brazil’s entire population was residing in Minas Gerais. The excitement of the thought of instant wealth brought many people to the mines. The Brazilian Gold Rush also provided a new excuse for slavery to thrive as thousands upon thousands were forced to do the work, while the slave/mine owners prospered.

The initial Brazilian Gold Rush lasted until the late 1800s. Those present-day village residents known as garimpeiros still try to make a living from gold mining.

Brazil’s modern illicit gold mining industry world 

The necessity of the Amazon is indisputable, however, abuses of it and its natural resources persist in ways that are detrimental to the rainforest, the surrounding local communities, and the planet. Brazil’s illicit gold mining industry began to fully blossom in the 1950s consequently making the Amazon a focal point for the Brazilian Government. Up until this point, the traditional means of accessing the Amazon were via waterways, however, while this may have been somewhat sufficient for exploratory purposes, if the government were to extract resources in abundance then it would need a more convenient means of access. The solution was to build a network of roads and highways penetrating the forest, thus allowing not only mass settlement in the region but also the opportunity to extract resources quickly and effectively. This was also seen as a way to prevent further migration in the south of Brazil because highly successful agricultural operations were already underway and the government wanted to avoid any conflict between farmers in the region.

Management of the rainforest's resources began to take shape with Brazil’s Agrarian Reform Program. The program, established in the 1970s, has since trans-located approximately 1.2 million settlers, mostly into Amazonian hinterlands. Available records indicate that between 1995 and 2011, 1,235,130 families had been trans-located into 8865 settlement projects, those of which account for roughly 10.3% of Brazil’s territory. Though only 13% of those families have been relocated to Amazonia, this program has still been heavily taxing on the Amazon. This is due, in large part, to the lackluster enforcement of environmental regulations by the government. Though Brazil’s Ministry of Agrarian Development presides over the land allocations and regulations that stipulate the rules landowners must adhere to, they fail in ensuring cooperation. For example, in an assessment from 1985-2001, of 4,340 agrarian settlement projects, only 43% retained the mandated environmental buffer established by the ministry. Also, BBrandil Amazonia reported the highest rates of illegal timber extraction. This resulted in a situation in which the Brazilian Environmental Agency (Instituto Brasileiro do Meio Ambiente e dos Recursos Naturais Renováveis—IBAMA) repeatedly fined the federal agrarian agency (Instituto Nacional de Colonização e Reforma Agrária—INCRA). Thus, there ensues a case in which government agencies that preside in overlapping jurisdictions fail to clearly define multilateral policy objectives, which ultimately produces inefficiencies.

When this rural-rural migration took place, the land that the migrants were allotted was often infertile. Once they found that the land they were allowed to farm on was not yielding consistently, they saw the need to make use of the entirety of their allotment thus leading to the deforestation of the required riparian buffers. However, even after having made use of the entire plot, they did not realize any substantial produce this series of eventsthat has led many to resort to illegal mining.

Gold mining is explicitly illegal in the Amazon according to official federal mandates, howeverHoweverrsists due to the lack of government oversight described earlier. One maneuver that gold prospectors have been employing is to pay local village leaders to “‘guide’” them through the local forests. Because the government does a poor job of patrolling the forest, the local chiefs are the informal gatekeepers and can essentially control who has permission to mine. This dynamic is a newer emergence, however. After the initial Amazonian development boom took place in the 1970s, many of the indigenous Amazonian tribes took action against the exploitation of the forest. These efforts largely took place in the 80s and achieved marked success. Among the victories that local people enjoyed was a greater emphasis on the conservation of the forest itself and the limitation of mining. Many developers took little issue with the limitation of mining practices because, at the time, the price of gold did not render it worth the hassle. In the early 21st century, the price increased greatly, thus making the risk worth the potential reward. Not dodoes mining, in general, contribute to deforestation, but the crude methods used in ‘wildcat mining’, specifically, poison the ground and surrounding water supplies.

However, while the market for gold in the Amazon is technically an illicit act, those who mine in the Amazon are simply meeting a real global demand. The global demand for gold rose in 2019 to 2,351 tonnes following increases from, among others, China and India. Additionally, gold accumulation by official sectors rose 75% in 2018.

Present-day miners and culture
Brazilian miners, garimpeiros, came from all walks of life and corners of the country out to the Amazon rainforest to mine for gold.  These men, much like the 49ers in California, ventured out on their own and mined the jungle without interference from the government or any other entity.  Makeshift towns and enterprising people followed these men into the jungle. “In all Garimpos there is a considerable floating population of non-garimpieros supplying goods and services; cooks, male and female prostitutes, mechanics, mule drivers, gold buyers, police troopers, traders, pilots, doctors, dentists, entertainers, photographers, and others”. The culture that surrounds these camps is, on one hand, a brotherhood where every miner looks out for one another, however, on the other hand, it seems that it is survival of the fittest. “Life inside Garimpos is wild and anarchic. It sees other garimpieros as competitors rather than comrades. Gold is seen as fundamentally corrupting. It ignites greed and amorality in people who seem, and may even once have been, honest and likable”.  These makeshift pop-up towns seemed to resemble that of the Wild West in America, where the law was scarce, and a sense of Darwinism was established.

Natural resources hang in the balance
While the fleeting wealth brought all the Garampieros, they brought the destruction of the ecosystem. From the beginning up until the present day, miners are still looking for their wealth. The difference is that today’s technology vastly accelerates the mining process in the jungle, affecting double or triple the amount of land before. The recent popularity surge in gold mining is due to the unstable global economy over the past two decades.

Gold mining in the Amazon rainforest has destroyed whole state-sized chunks of the rainforest. However, the destruction is not simply kept to where the mining occurs. Mercury is used pto purifying gold in the Amazon. Unfortunately, this toxic element has been reported downstream as poisoning the fish that fishermen catch and sell in the markets. This technique of separation, called amalgamation, is done without protective equipment and without any regulations to discard the mercury safely. Therefore, a massive amount of mercury has been flowing down the Amazon River since it first made its way into the hands of the miners. According to the University of Idaho, it is believed that gold mining contributes to approximately 80% (168 tons annually) of mercury contamination.  Mercury has devastating effects on wildlife and ultimately on the people who ingest this deadly poison.  It can ha the pregnant mother's fetus, resultingults in abnormal growth/malformation of the baby’s central nervous system. The two main sources of mercury contamination are the fish that these communities consume and how close to mining the individual is, and more importantly, the exposure to amalgamation.

There are often harmful, societal by-products that mining has brought to communities near various operations. Among such byproducts are prostitution, drugs, alcohol abuse, and violence. For example, in 2017 the New York Times reported that 10 members of an ‘uncontacted’ Amazonian tribe had been murdered by gold miners near the Columbia border. Another negative aspect of mining is that it renders the land essentially useless for further use. Most of the mining that takes place in the Amazon is done via the aforementioned process known as ‘wildcat mining’, in which miners essentially try their luck in different locations without sophisticated surveying technology. This results in a gritty operation through the use of hazardous technology such as explosive fertilizer and mercury, which ensures the capture of even the smallest pieces of gold. This poisons and degrades the surrounding soil and can pollute water sources up to one hundred miles away. Regarding the economy of illicit gold mining in particular, another issue is that the lack of regulation inhibits the government from being able to capture any rent from mining activities.

The Amazon provides several ecosystem services. It is widely known that it is the world’s largest carbon sink, however, if it were to reach approximately 20-25% deforestation, this could be the tipping point at which it would no longer be a buffer against atmospheric carbon dioxide build-up. CurrThe Brazilian government currently estimates the current deforestation level to be3%. Also, the Amazon is responsible for about 16% of all oxygen produced on land regulating weather patterns and mitigating climate change.

Gold mining resurgence
Many experts have speculated that ever since the global economy took a crash over 2 decades ago, gold’s worth has been on the rise ever since. “The price of gold, which stood at $271 an ounce on September 10, 2001, hit $1,023 in March 2008, and it may surpass that threshold again. Gold's recent surge, sparked in part by the terrorist attack on 9/11, has been amplified by the slide of the U.S. dollar and jitters over a looming global recession”.  This jump in gold prices was especially drastic in 2005 when the price continued to climb every year at a rate of nearly 200 dollars per year, which previously took over 160 years to achieve. This spike in price is an ominous warning to the global economy. However, this would explain why deforestation rates during the same period have reached an all-time high.  Gold mining over the past five years in the Amazon however has taken a hit due to the unpopularity of gold.

See also
Brazilian Gold Rush

References

 
History of mining in Brazil
History of Minas Gerais